Brunia is a genus of tiger moths in the family Erebidae. The genus was erected by Frederic Moore in 1878.

Species
 Brunia antica (Walker 1854)
 Brunia apicalis (Walker, 1862)
 Brunia badrana (Moore, 1859)
 Brunia cucullata (Moore, 1878)
 Brunia dorsalis Walker, 1866
 Brunia ekeikei Bethune-Baker, 1904
 Brunia fumidisca (Hampson, 1894)
 Brunia gibonica (Černý, 2009)
 Brunia lacrima (Černý, 2009)
 Brunia nebulifera (Hampson, 1900)
 Brunia sarawaka (Butler, 1877)
 Brunia testacea (Rothschild, 1912)

References

Notes
 
 Holloway, J. D. (2001). "The Moths of Borneo: subfamily Arctiinae, subfamily Lithosiinae". Malayan Nature Journal. 55: 279–458.

External links

Lithosiina
Moth genera